These are the international rankings of El Salvador

Economy
The World Economic Forum's Global Competitiveness Report ranked El Salvador 77 out of 133.

El Salvador  ranks 124th  among 189 countries in the Human Development Index. 

El Salvador has the second-highest level of income equality in  Latin America.

Government
Transparency International
in its Corruption Perceptions Index ranked  El Salvador 84 out of 180 countries.

Mental health
El Salvador is the 34th happiest country in the world  according to the Happy Planet Index.

Military

In the Global Peace Index  El Salvador is ranked 94 out of 144.

References

El Salvador